Ōshima, Oshima, Ooshima or Ohshima may refer to:

Places
 (sorted by prefecture):
 Ōshima (Aomori), an island in Hiranai and a part of Asamushi-Natsudomari Prefectural Natural Park
 Nii Ōshima Island, part of Niihama in Ehime Prefecture
 Ōshima (Ehime), an island connected by the Hakata-Ōshima Bridge and the Kurushima-Kaikyo Bridge
 , an island in Genkai Sea of Fukuoka, Japan
 Ōshima, Fukuoka, a former village in Munakata District, which became part of the city of Munakata, Fukuoka in 2005
 Amami Ōshima in Kagoshima Prefecture
 Ōshima District, Kagoshima
 Ōshima Subprefecture (Kagoshima)
 Ōshima, Nagasaki (Kitamatsuura), former village in Kitamatsura district
 Ōshima, Nagasaki (Nishisonogi), former town in Nishisonogi district
 Ōshima, Nagasaki (Nishisonogi), town merged in 2005 into Saikai, Nagasaki
 Ōshima, Niigata
 Ōshima Subprefecture (Tokyo)
 Izu Ōshima, one of the Izu Islands in Tokyo
 Ōshima, Toyama, has a volcano
 Kii Ōshima in Wakayama Prefecture
 Ōshima District, Yamaguchi, which includes:
 Ōshima, Yamaguchi, a former town in Oshima District, Yamaguchi, now part of Suō-Ōshima, Yamaguchi
 Oshima (Hokkaido), an island in the Sea of Japan belonging to Matsumae, Hokkaidō
:
 Oshima Province, former province located in Hokkaidō
 Oshima Subprefecture, a subprefecture of Hokkaidō
 Oshima Peninsula, the geographical area on which the subprefecture is located

Other uses
 Ōshima (surname)
 Oshima Brothers, an American folk-pop music duo
 Japanese gunboat Ōshima - a warship of the early Imperial Japanese Navy
 Ōshima stable, a stable of sumo wrestlers
 Amami Ōshima language, spoken in the Ryukyu Islands

See also
 Ōshima Subprefecture (disambiguation)
 Not to be confused with Osimo, Italy